The 2017 LFF I Lyga is the 28th season of the I Lyga, the second tier association football league of Lithuania. The season began on 24 March 2017 and is scheduled to end on 5 November 2017.

Teams

Changes from last season
A total of fifteen clubs were confirmed for the season, a decrease of one spot compared to the last year sixteen. Four of them are reserve teams of the A Lyga sides - one more than last season and absolute maximum allowed for the competitions.

No teams were relegated from the top tier, due to last year I Lyga winners Šilas owner decision to relegate his club into the II Lyga after an investigation of match-fixing  during a pre-season tournament was started (and later completed).

Three teams were automatically promoted from the II Lyga – West zone winners Pakruojis, South zone winners Stumbras B and East zone winners Utenis B, while II Lyga West zone silver medalists Koralas have received a special permission to compete in the league, after meeting all licensing criterios. Such permission was also given for Tauras, who were recreated after one season of complete inactivity in any football related activity.

Stadiums, personnel and sponsorship

League table

Results

Attendance

Average home attendances

Highest attendances

References

External links
 

I Lyga seasons
2017 in Lithuanian football
Lith
Lith